Nemateleotris helfrichi, Helfrich's Dartfish, is a species of dartfish native to the Pacific Ocean.

Description
They have bright yellow head with purple forehead with purple and white shades on body. They have 7 dorsal spines 28-31 dorsal soft rays and 1 anal spine   26-28 anal soft rays.

Distribution and Habitat
They are present in the Pacific Ocean between latitudes 16°N and  28°S. Their range extends from Indonesia to Tuamotu Archipelago. They prefer deeper waters than other Nemateleotris. They are found swimming a few meters above the water bed. They are found at a depths between and are rarely found above .

Diet
They are carnivorous. N. helfrichi mainly feed on zooplanktons, amphipods, copepods, small crustaceans and shrimp larvae. They are said to lose their bright colour if their dietary requirements are not met.

Behaviour
The species is monogamous and are usually found in pairs. They are territorial and will fight with conspecifics unless they are a pair. The species is shy and hides in small caves when threatened.

In the aquarium
Due to their bright colour they are very popular as a marine aquarium fish. They are also more delicate and rare form than other more common firefish species (as evidenced by their price) and should be kept by marine-aquarists of intermediate expertise or higher.

Name
The specific name honours Philip Helfrich, an Emeritus Director and Researcher, Hawaii Institute of Marine Biology (University of Hawaii), and the director of the Eniwetok Marine Biological Laboratory, who collected some of the first specimens of this species.

References 

helfrichi
Tropical fish
Fish described in 1973
Taxa named by John Ernest Randall
Taxa named by Gerald R. Allen